Notonomus satrapa is a species of ground beetle in the subfamily Pterostichinae. It was described by Castelnau in 1867.

References

Notonomus
Taxa named by François-Louis Laporte, comte de Castelnau
Beetles described in 1867